The 2021–22 Coupe de France preliminary rounds, Auvergne-Rhône-Alpes was the qualifying competition to decide which teams from the leagues of the Auvergne-Rhône-Alpes region of France took part in the main competition from the seventh round.

A total of nineteen teams qualified from the Auvergne-Rhône-Alpes preliminary rounds. In 2020–21, GFA Rumilly-Vallières progressed furthest in the main competition, becoming the first fourth tier side to reach the semi-final by beating Toulouse in the quarter-finals, before losing to Monaco.

Draws and fixtures
On 10 August 2021, the league announced that a record 947 clubs had entered the competition from the region. The draw for the first round, featuring 836 teams from the district leagues and Régional 3, was made on 2 August 2021. Nine clubs in scope were exempted to the second round. The second round draw was published on 23 August 2021, with the exempted clubs and clubs from Régional 2 entering. The third round draw took place on 8 September 2021, and saw the Régional 1 and Championnat National 3 teams entering. The fourth round draw took place on 22 September 2021, and saw the Championnat National 2 teams entering. The fifth round draw, which saw the Championnat National teams entering, was made on 6 October 2021. The sixth round draw was made on 21 October 2021.

First round
These matches were played on 28 and 29 August 2021.

Second round
These matches were played on 4, 5 and 8 September 2021.

Third round
These matches were played on 17, 18 and 19 September 2021.

Fourth round
These matches were played on 2 and 3 October 2021.

Fifth round
These matches were played on 16 and 17 October 2021.

Sixth round
These matches were played on 30 and 31 October 2021.

References

preliminary rounds